Wehmeyera is a genus of fungi within the Melanconidaceae family. This is a monotypic genus, containing the single species Wehmeyera acerina.

References

External links
Wehmeyera at Index Fungorum

Melanconidaceae
Monotypic Sordariomycetes genera